Army Medical College (}), also known as AM College) is a military institute which was established in 1977 as a residential institution for imparting undergraduate medical education to selected cadets. The college also allows the admission of civilian students who do not want to join the Pakistan Army. Degree awarded by AM College is accredited by the Pakistan Medical and Dental Council (PMDC).

The college was initially affiliated with Quaid-i-Azam University (QAU) for MBBS degree. From 1998 to 2015, the college was affiliated with National University of Sciences and Technology (Pakistan) (NUST). The college is now a constituent campus of National University of Medical Sciences (NUMS). 
The induction of students in Army Medical College is done by two methods, one is through Medical Cadet Course and the other is through NUMS entrance test. NUMS seats are for, but not limited to, civilians while only medical cadets can join Pakistan Army. Up till 2021, foreign students could apply on the basis of SAT Subject Tests results in lieu of the NUMS test like other medical colleges in Pakistan.

See also
 National University of Medical Sciences
 Pakistan Medical and Dental Council

Medical colleges in Punjab, Pakistan
Military education and training in Pakistan
Universities and colleges in Rawalpindi District
Military medicine in Pakistan